The impressed tortoise (Manouria impressa) occurs in mountainous forest areas in Southeast Asia, mainly in Myanmar Burma, southern China, Thailand, Laos, Vietnam, Cambodia, Malaysia and Northeast India. The species has a golden brown shell and skin.

Its behavior is little known due to the small known population; diet in the wild may consist largely of mushrooms, although bamboo shoots are also eaten. The species is known for being difficult to keep alive in captivity because not much is known about it; although its status in the wild is uncertain, it is eaten widely by local people and little captive breeding has occurred. Humans use impressed tortoises for cell, trading, pets, and food; but some places like Thailand have established a wildlife conservation law to protect them.

See also

References

Further reading
Günther A (1882). "Description of a new Species of Tortoise (Geoemyda impressa) from Siam". Proc. Zool. Soc. London 1882: 343–346.

External links
Fritz U, Havaš P (2007). Checklist of Chelonians of the World.  Website.
Espenshade, William H.; Buskirk, James. Manouria impressa (Günther 1882): A Summary of Known & Anecdotal Information. . California Turtle & Tortoise Club.

WANCHAI, P., STANFORD, C. B., THIRAKHUPT, K., & THANHIKORN, S. (2012, October). Home range of the IMPRESSED Tortoise, Manouria impressa ... Retrieved March 26, 2021, from http://www.biology.sc.chula.ac.th/TNH/archives/v12_no2/4-PRATYAPORN%20Proof2.pdf

WANCHAI, P., Stanford, C. B., Pradatsundarasar, A., Tharapoom, K., & Thirakhupt, K. (2013, April). Activity budget of the IMPRESSED Tortoise, (Günther, 1882 ... Retrieved March 26, 2021, from http://www.biology.sc.chula.ac.th/TNH/archives/v13_no1/39-48%20Wanchai.pdf

Manouria
Reptiles of China
Reptiles of Myanmar
Reptiles of Thailand
Reptiles of Laos
Reptiles of Cambodia
Reptiles of Malaysia
Reptiles of Vietnam
Reptiles described in 1882
Taxa named by Albert Günther